Davit II may refer to:

 Davit II, Caucasian Albanian Catholicos in 765–769
 David II of Georgia, the Builder, King in 1089–1125
 David II, Catholicos-Patriarch of Georgia, ruled in 1426–1428
 David II of Kakheti, King in 1709–1722